Bathytoma parengonia is a species of sea snail, a marine gastropod mollusk in the family Borsoniidae.

Description
The length of the shell attains 30 mm.

Distribution
This marine species is endemic to the Chatham Rise, New Zealand.

References

 Watson, R.B. 1881. Mollusca of H.M.S. 'Challenger' Expedition-part VIII. The Zoological Journal of the Linnean Society,15: 388-475.  
 Spencer, H.G., Marshall, B.A. & Willan, R.C. (2009). Checklist of New Zealand living Mollusca. pp 196–219. in: Gordon, D.P. (ed.) New Zealand inventory of biodiversity. Volume one. Kingdom Animalia: Radiata, Lophotrochozoa, Deuterostomia. Canterbury University Press, Christchurch.

External links
 

parengonia
Gastropods of New Zealand
Gastropods described in 1956